Van der Valk is a British television crime drama series produced for the ITV network. The original series was created by Nicolas Freeling based on his novels about a detective in Amsterdam, starring Barry Foster in the role of titular character Simon "Piet" van der Valk. It ran from 1972 to 1992. The updated version, premiering in 2020, was created and written by Chris Murray, with Marc Warren reviving the van der Valk role.

The 2020 remake was again produced for ITV. The new series debuted in the United Kingdom on 26 April 2020, and the second series began airing in the UK on 7 August 2022. The third series has completed filming and is due for release in 2023.

Cast and characters

1972–1992
 Barry Foster as Commissaris Simon "Piet" van der Valk 
 Michael Latimer as Inspecteur Johnny Kroon (Series 1–2)
 Susan Travers as Arlette van der Valk (Series 1–2)
 Joanna Dunham as Arlette van der Valk (Series 3)
 Meg Davies as Arlette van der Valk (Series 4–5)
 Martin Wyldeck as Hoofd-commissaris Samson (Series 1)
 Nigel Stock as Hoofd-commissaris Samson (Series 3)
 Ronald Hines as Hoofd-commissaris Samson (Series 4–5)
 Sydney Tafler as Hoofd-commissaris Halsbeek (Series 2)
 Richard Huw as Wim van der Valk (Series 4–5)
 Dave Carter as Brigadier Stribos (Series 1–2)
 Natasha Pyne as Janet (Series 4–5)
 Alan Haines as Brigadier Mertens (Series 1)

2020–present
 Marc Warren as Commissaris Piet van der Valk 
 Maimie McCoy as Inspecteur Lucienne Hassell 
 Luke Allen-Gale as Brigadier (Sergeant) Brad de Vries (Series 1–2)
 Elliot Barnes-Worrell as Job Cloovers (Series 1–2)
 Azan Ahmed as Eddie Suleman (Series 3)
 Django Chan-Reeves as Citra Li (Series 3)
 Darrell D'Silva as Hendrik Davie, a police forensic pathologist
 Emma Fielding as Hoofdcommissaris Julia Dahlman
 Loes Haverkort as Lena Linderman (Series 2–3)
 Peter van Heeringen as Homeless Frank
 Mike Libanon as Cliff Palache

Background and production
The original series were all produced by Thames Television for the ITV network. The first three series were produced between 1972 and 1977, with two more being commissioned in 1991 and 1992.

The first and second series were recorded on 2" quadruplex videotape at Thames' Teddington Studios in London, with location scenes shot in Amsterdam on 16mm film.
The third series was generally made on location, entirely on 16mm film, by Thames's subsidiary Euston Films.
The fourth series and fifth series were  produced by Elmgate Productions, and also entirely shot on 35mm film. The final two series were also filmed entirely shot on location in the Netherlands and were transmitted in stereo sound using the NICAM system.

Setting and characters
The television series was based on the characters and atmosphere, but not the plots, of the original novels. The stories mostly take place in and around Amsterdam, where Commissaris van der Valk is a cynical yet intuitive detective. Drugs, sex and murder are among the gritty themes of the casework, presented in contrast to the picturesque locations and the upbeat theme music (see below).

In the opening credits of the first series, Van der Valk is standing inside the tower of the Westerkerk.

Van der Valk contrasts with his naïve assistant, Inspecteur Johnny Kroon, played by Michael Latimer (only in the first two series), and his superior, Hoofd-commissaris Samson, who deals with the political fallout of the cases. Samson was played by three actors over the course of the show: Martin Wyldeck for two episodes in 1972, Nigel Stock for 12 episodes in 1977, and Ronald Hines for the revival in 1991–92. Van der Valk's French wife Arlette was played by three actresses over the course of the show's twenty-year run: initially by Susan Travers, Joanna Dunham for the third series, and finally Meg Davies for the revival in 1991–92. Other actors in the series included Alan Haines, who played Brig Mertens, and Richard Huw, who played Van der Valk's son Wim, also a police detective, in the revival.

Locations: 1972–1992
Series 1 and 2 are set at the art nouveau Politiebureau no. 14 at Leidseplein 15, while series 3 to 5 show the Amsterdam police headquarters at Marnixstraat 260-264.

S01 E01 "One Herring's Not Enough": Schiller Hotel (Rembrandtplein) 
S01 E02 "Destroying Angel": Stadsschouwburg, Apollo Hotel, Aerdenhout, Zandvoort beach
S01 E06 "The Adventurer": Westerkerk, d’Vijff Vlieghen (Spuistraat 294), Apollo Hotel
S02 E01 "A Death by the Sea": Bonebakker jeweller's (Rokin 88-99)
S02 E02 "A Man of No Importance": Demka-spoorbrug over the Amsterdam-Rijnkanaal, Magere Brug, Waterlooplein market, Mozes en Aäronkerk, Centraal station, De Oude Prins, Amstelzijde 37 (now Loetje aan de Amstel) and ‘Antiek O.V. Kemeling’, Amstelzijde 33, Ouderkerk
S02 E03 "A Rose from Mr Reinhardt": Beatrixpark, Rembrandtplein, De Wallen
S02 E04 "A Dangerous Point of View": Albert Cuyp Market, Taanplaats (Spaarndam)
S02 E05 "Season for Love": Schiphol, De Krijtberg church, shop at Singel 419 and café at Singel 415
S03 E01 "Enemy": Car chase along Oostenburgergracht, :nl:Dageraadsbrug (nl), De Gooyer, Funenkade, Zeeburgerpad, Panamalaan, Nieuwe Entrepotdokschutsluis, :nl:Brug 352 (nl), Cruquiusweg loading ramp, Pakhuis Koning Willem I
S03 E05 "Man of Iron": Paradiso, Entrepotdok
S03 E03 "The Runt": Montelbaanstoren, Zuider IJdijk, Syphonsluis bij het :nl:Gemaal Zeeburg, Amsterdamse Brug, Kalkmarkt 5
S03 E04 "Wolf": Lijnbaansgracht 11, Leidsestraat, :nl:Reynders (café), Magere Brug, Vondelpark, Dam
S03 E06 "Everybody Does It": Victoria Hotel, NDSM, National Monument (Dam Square)
S03 E07 "Face Value": Schiphol, Okura Hotel (Ferdinand Bolstraat), Prinz Snackbar-Restaurant (Ceintuurbaan 350) and chase across Ceintuurbaan-Sarphatipark junction
S03 E08 "Dead on Arrival": Heathrow Airport, Victoria Embankment, London
S03 E09 "The Professor": American Hotel, Oudemanhuispoort, Nederlands Scheepvaartmuseum
S03 E11 "Gold Plated Delinquents": Kadijksplein
S03 E12 "Diane": Paulus Potterstraat, Reguliersbreestraat 44 (then Café Otten, now Burgerfabriek)
S04 E02 "Dangerous Games": Houthaven car ferry, Silodam, Oude Kerk, Multatuli statue (Torensluis), De Ruijterkade, Loods 6 (KNSM-Laan)
S04 E03 "A Sudden Silence": Kurhaus, Scheveningen, Sloterdijk station
S04 E04 "The Little Rascals": Prinsensluis, Silodam, Spui, Oudemanhuispoort book market
S05 E01 "The Ties that Bind": Hilton Hotel (Apollolaan)
S05 E02 "Proof of Life": Waterlooplein market, metro to Centraal, Muiderpoortstation
S05 E03 "Still Waters": landing stage on Snoekjesgracht, Kromboomsloot, Stopera
The Four Oaks Mystery: Ambassade Hotel (Herengracht 229), Nijlpaardenbrug (Entrepotdok)

Soundtrack
The signature theme, "Eye Level", was composed by Jack Trombey (a pseudonym of Dutch composer Jan Stoeckart) and was performed by the Simon Park Orchestra. It reached number one on the UK Singles Chart in 1973. Also that year, Matt Monro charted with a vocal version titled "And You Smiled". In the final TV series, the theme was played at a slightly faster tempo than previously.

2020 remake
Van der Valk returned to ITV as an updated new series in 2020, with Marc Warren playing the title role. Created and written by Chris Murray, continuity with the original series is not preserved in the remake, with revised and new characters, as well as new storylines, introduced. In the reboot, Piet is unmarried and his sidekick Lucienne Hassell is lesbian. A key riff from the original series' distinctive theme music ("Eye Level"), however, is echoed in the new theme music.

The remake is produced by Company Pictures, NL Film, ARD Degeto, and  PBS, with All3Media as international distributor. 

In May 2020, Warren confirmed that the show would return for a second series, although production might be delayed due to the COVID-19 pandemic.  Nevertheless, with actors, crew, and logistics established, filming on season 2 began with safety measures in place on 3 June 2021.

A third series was commissioned on 11 April 2022. Filming on Series 3 was completed in August 2022.

Locations: 2020–
Season 1 was filmed entirely in Amsterdam. Locations include the American Hotel, the Rijksmuseum, Achtergracht, NDSM, the Tommy Hilfiger HQ on Danzigerkade on the Houthaven and REM Eiland.

Season 2 was filmed in Amsterdam, Utrecht, and The Hague. Locations include Scheveningen Pier, the Muziekgebouw, A'DAM Tower, and Café Scheltema.

Release

Broadcast

2020 remake
The 2020 remake premiered in the United Kingdom on ITV on 26 April 2020, with season 1 consisting of three 90-minute episodes. 

In the Netherlands, Van der Valk debut on NPO 1 on 1 January 2020. In Germany, the series premiered on ARD. In the United States, it debut on PBS on 13 September 2020.

In Australia, it premiered on ABC. In New Zealand, on Vibe on 25 May 2020. In Belgium, it debut on VRT.

The second series debut in the UK on 7 August 2022. In the U.S., on 25 September 2022.

Home media

1972–1992
Van der Valk Season 1 was released on DVD in Region 2 in 2002. The remaining seasons were not released until "The Complete Series" box set by Network on 22 October 2007.  Network re-released the box set on 20 August 2018. In Region 4, Shock Entertainment released "The Complete Collection" box set on 18 September 2013, and was re-released by Via Vision Entertainment on 2 June 2021.

2020–present
Season 1 was released on DVD in Region 2 by Dazzler Media on 11 May 2020, and in Region 4 by ABC on 20 May 2020. It was released in Region 1 by PBS on 13 October 2020.

Season 2 was released first in Region 4 on 13 April 2022, followed by Region 2 on 22 August 2022, and Region 1 on 11 October 2022.

Episodes (1972–1992)

Series 1 (1972)

Series 2 (1973)

Series 3 (1977)

Series 4 (1991)

Series 5 (1992)

Episodes (2020–)

Series 1 (2020)

Locations
E02 "Only in Amsterdam": Het Veem (Houthaven), Laagte Kadijk, Scharrebiersluis, Plantage Parklaan, Nieuwe Teertuinen, (Prinseneilandsgracht)

Series 2 (2022)

Series 3 (2023)

References

Further reading
2020 remake

External links

 Van der Valk at Company Pictures
 Van der Valk at PBS
 Van der Valk at NL Film

1972 British television series debuts
1992 British television series endings
2020 British television series debuts
1970s British drama television series
1990s British drama television series
1970s British crime television series
1990s British crime television series
2020s British crime television series
2020s British mystery television series
2020s British LGBT-related drama television series
British crime television series
British detective television series
British mystery television series
Detective television series
English-language television shows
Lesbian-related television shows
Television shows based on British novels
Television shows set in the Netherlands
Television series by Euston Films
Television series by Fremantle (company)
Television shows produced by Thames Television
Television shows shot at Teddington Studios
ITV television dramas